Eurockot Launch Services GmbH is a commercial spacecraft launch provider and was founded in 1995. Eurockot uses an  expendable launch vehicle called the Rockot to place satellites into low Earth orbit (LEO). Eurockot is jointly owned by ArianeGroup, which holds 51 percent, and by Khrunichev State Research and Production Space Center, which holds 49 percent. Eurockot launches from dedicated launch facilities at the Plesetsk Cosmodrome in northern Russia.

Eurockot performed its first commercial launch in May 2000.

References

External links

Commercial launch service providers
Khrunichev Center
Airbus Defence and Space
Companies established in 1995